{{Infobox election
| election_name      = 2000 United States Senate election in Wyoming
| country            = Wyoming
| type               = presidential
| ongoing            = no
| previous_election  = 1994 United States Senate election in Wyoming
| previous_year      = 1994
| next_election      = 2006 United States Senate election in Wyoming
| next_year          = 2006
| election_date      = November 7, 2000
| image_size         = 125x136px

| image1             = 
| nominee1           = Craig L. Thomas
| party1             = Republican Party (United States)
| popular_vote1      = 157,622
| percentage1        = 73.8%

| image2             = 
| nominee2           = Mel Logan
| party2             = Democratic Party (United States)
| popular_vote2      = 47,087
| percentage2        = 22.0%

| map_image          = 2000 United States Senate election in Wyoming results map by county.svg
| map_size           = 250px
| map_caption        = County results Thomas:    
| title              = U.S. Senator
| before_election    = Craig L. Thomas
| before_party       = Republican Party (United States)
| after_election     = Craig L. Thomas
| after_party        = Republican Party (United States)
}}

The 2000 United States Senate election in Wyoming''' was held on November 7, 2000. Incumbent Republican U.S. Senator Craig Thomas won re-election to a second term.

Democratic primary

Candidates 
 Mel Logan, mine worker
 Sheldon Sumey

Results

Republican primary

Candidates 
 Craig Thomas, incumbent U.S. Senator

Results

General election

Candidates 
 Mel Logan (D), mine worker
 Craig Thomas (R), incumbent U.S. Senator

Results

See also 
 2000 United States Senate elections

References 

Wyoming
2000
2000 Wyoming elections